Mamohato Bereng Seeiso (née Princess Tabitha 'Masentle Lerotholi Mojela) (28 April 1941 – 6 September 2003) served as the Regent Head of State of Lesotho on three occasions: 5 June to 5 December 1970, 10 March to 12 November 1990 and 15 January to 7 February 1996.

Biography 
'Mamohato was born at Tebang, located in the District of Mafeteng. She was the youngest child of Lerotholi Mojela (1895–1961), Chief of Tsakholo.

The princess was sent to study at Bath Training College of Home Economics in the United Kingdom.

A year after the death of her father, she married Moshoeshoe II. During her reign, she helped improve children's education in Lesotho.

The queen died on September 6, 2003 of heart failure while at a Catholic retreat for the Order of Saint Cecilia at the Auray Mission in Mantsonyane.

Charity work and legacy 
There is a hospital named for her, the Queen 'Mamohato Memorial Hospital.

The queen, known as the "Mother of the Nation" created Hlokomela Bana in the 1980s to provide care and support for some of the most vulnerable children in Lesotho. Hlokomela Bana, which means “Take Care of Children” in Sesotho, works closely with principal chiefs to identify what support can be best provided to those who have lost their parents or are living with disabilities.

Family
She was the wife of King Moshoeshoe II and the mother of King Letsie III, Prince Seeiso and Princess Constance Christina 'Maseeiso.

Titles
1941–1962: Tabitha 'Masentle Lerotholi Mojela.
1962–1966: HRH Princess 'Mamohato Bereng Seeiso.
1966–1996: HM The Queen.
5 June – 5 December 1970, 10 March – 12 November 1990, 15 January – 7 February 1996: HM The Queen Regent
1996–2003: HM Queen 'Mamohato Bereng Seeiso, The Queen Mother

References

1941 births
2003 deaths
20th-century women rulers
Women rulers in Africa
Heads of state of Lesotho
House of Moshesh
Lesotho women in politics
Lesotho Christians
African queen mothers